INS Tillanchang (T92) is a patrol vessel of the  in the Indian Navy. The ship was commissioned on 9 March 2017, at  the naval base at Karwar.

References

Car Nicobar-class patrol vessels
2015 ships